All American High is a 1987 documentary film directed by Keva Rosenfeld that chronicles the life of the 1984 senior class at Torrance High School in Los Angeles County, California.

The film is narrated by the Finnish exchange student “Rikki” Rauhala and observes 1980s California high school culture from a foreigner's perspective.

The film was independently financed, with additional funds provided through an American Film Institute (AFI)−National Endowment for the Arts (NEA) grant.  The film was selected for Grand Jury Prize competition at the 1987 Sundance Film Festival. It was originally broadcast on Public Broadcasting Service (PBS).

All American High Revisited
A second documentary film about the former Torrance High senior class was directed by Keva Rosenfeld in 2014 (released in 2015), All American High Revisited. It combines the original film with new footage of the film's principal subjects being interviewed on their high school years, the process of growing up, and the various paths in life that they took.

Critical reception 
People Magazine:  “Keva Rosenfeld does a spectacular job of candidly capturing the life of typical suburban teens. It is true. It is hilarious. It’s a little frightening. This is one wonderfully entertaining documentary.” 
 LA Times, Patrick Goldstein: a “topsy-turvy blend of the innocent and the exotic.” “Startling...” and added, “rarely intrusive and never condescending.”
  Hollywood Reporter, Duane Byrge: “Fascinating, insightful, and highly entertaining.“Every bit as piercing as Fredrick Wiseman’s classic portrait “High School.”
 New York Times, Vincent Canby: “If Keva Rosenfeld’s vividly satiric All American High is to be believed, this country is headed for hell on a surfboard...”
 LA Times, Sheila Benson: “The most cheerfully terrifying movie I think I’ve ever seen.”
   Sneak Previews, Michael Medved: "A brilliantly conceived motion picture."
   The Village Voice, J. Hoberman: "Bears out Werner Herzog's observation that, although they believe they are normal, Americans are the most exotic people on earth."
   L.A. Weekly, John Powers: "A documentary that might chill you were it not so funny."

Nominations and awards 
 Sundance Film Festival, 1987 Nominated Grand Jury Prize, Documentary.
 International Documentary Association, “Distinguished Documentary Achievement Award” (1986).

Festival showings 
 London Film Festival
 Hong Kong International Film Festival, 1987
 Jerusalem Film Festival, 1987
 San Francisco International Film Festival, 1987
 New Directors/New Films Festival, Film Society of Lincoln Center, shown at NY Museum of Modern Art
 Chicago International Film Festival, 1986, Nominated Gold Hugo Award - Documentary
 Sundance Film Festival, 1987, Nominated Grand Jury Prize - Documentary

See also

References

Further reading

External links
 
  Like Totally 80s Blog: "Interview with Keva Rosenfeld" — on All American High  and All American High Revisited.

1986 films
1986 documentary films
American documentary television films
Documentary films about high school in the United States
Films set in Los Angeles County, California
Torrance High School
History of Torrance, California
1986 in California
1980s American films